Ruth Lillian Christmas (12 November 1904 – 2 April 2001) was a British middle-distance runner.

Christmas and her sister Esther followed their father into athletics.  Ruth began competing in Cambridge in the 1920s, then moved to London and joined the London Olympiades women's athletics club.  She took second place in the half-mile at the British Championships in 1929, and began competing internationally, recording impressive results.  In the mile, she recorded a possible world record time of 5:27.5 in 1932.

In her favoured distance of 880-yards or 800-metres, Christmas had a longstanding rivalry with Gladys Lunn, and finally beat her in the 1933 British Championships.  She gained French nationality through marriage, becoming Ruth Christmas-Paysant, and began competing for her adopted homeland, winning the 1935 French Championships 800-metre title, and the cross-country equivalent in 1936.  In 1939, she and her husband returned to Britain to avoid the oncoming World War II, and she retired from athletics.

References

1904 births
2001 deaths
English female middle-distance runners
English emigrants to France
French female middle-distance runners
Sportspeople from Cambridge
20th-century French women